The 1997 IHF Super Globe was the first edition of the tournament. It was held in Wiener Neustadt, Austria at from  3 – 8 January 1997.

Caja Cantabria de Santander defeated Drammen HK in an all-European final by 30–29.

Teams

Preliminary round

Group A

Group B

Knockout stage

Championship bracket

7th–8th-place match

5th–6th-place match

Semifinal matches

Bronze-medal match

Final match

Final ranking

References

External links
Official website

IHF Super Globe
1997 IHF Super Globe
IHF Super Globe
International handball competitions hosted by Austria
Sports competitions in Vienna